Embaixador Walther Moreira Salles  is the airport serving Poços de Caldas, Brazil. It is named after Walter Moreira Salles, a banker and philanthropist.

It is managed by contract by Infraero.

History
The airport was opened in 1937.

Airlines and destinations
No scheduled flights operate at this airport.

Access

See also

List of airports in Brazil

References

External links

Airports in Minas Gerais
Airports established in 1937